Sat Na Gat is a 2013 movie based on a 1992 novel by Rajan Khan.

Cast
 Mahesh Manjrekar
 Bharat Jadhav
 Pakhi Hegde
 Vaibhav Mangle
 Sayaji Shinde

References

2010s Marathi-language films